St Mary's Church, Bunny is a Grade I listed parish church in the Church of England in Bunny, Nottinghamshire.

History

The present church dates from the 14th century. It was restored in 1718 for Sir Thomas Parkyns, 2nd Baronet of Bunny Hall. There were also later restorations in 1890–1891 and 1911. The initial 14th-century build was temporarily halted by the spread of the plague into the village in 1350. The present building has developed over several centuries. The nave and aisles were built of loosely-coursed rubble, quite different from the hewn, squared stone of the later 14th-century chancel and tower. Inside there is an oak screen, also dated as 14th century, and the vestry has a medieval aumbry – a cupboard where the sacred vessels were kept. The south porch, with its stone seats, was added in the 15th century.

The church is in a joint parish with 
Bradmore Mission Room
St Mary Magdalene's Church, Keyworth
All Saints' Church, Stanton on the Wolds

Memorials

George Augustus Henry Anne Parkyns, 1830, wall tablet in the east chancel
Thomas Boothby Parkyns, 1800, wall tablet in the east chancel
George Alexander Forteath, 1862, wall tablet in the south chancel
Sir Thomas Parkyns, d.1806, by John Bacon
Dame Anne Parkyns, 1725, by Edward Poynton
Richard Parkyns, 1603
Isabella Beetham, 1814, south aisle 
Isabella Ann Beetham, 1801, south aisle
Henry Cropper, 1812 by T. & E. Gaffin of Regent Street
Henry Cropper, 1726
Elizabeth Cropper, 1800, by J. Peck 
Henry Cropper, 1794
Humphrey Barley, 1571, inscription obliterated 
Sir Thomas Parkyns, 1741. North aisle. Designed by himself

Organ
The organ is by J. W. Walker & Sons Ltd dating from 1909. It was reconstructed in 1916 by Charles Lloyd. A specification of the organ can be found on the National Pipe Organ Register.

References

14th-century church buildings in England
Church of England church buildings in Nottinghamshire
Grade I listed churches in Nottinghamshire